WSEO (107.7 FM) is a radio station broadcasting a New Country format. Licensed to Nelsonville, Ohio, United States, the station is currently owned by Nelsonville TV Cable and under the management of TMCR Broadcasting.

The station went on the air as WSNV on 1989-09-29. On 1990-01-22, the station changed its call sign to WAIS-FM, and on 1990-07-23 to the current WSEO. The station first began broadcasting from studios above its parent company's cable studios in downtown Nelsonville until the early 1990s when its owner built a new cinder-block, windowless station on U.S. Route 33 near the Hocking River, housing WSEO and its sister AM station, WAIS.

The studios were a first of their kind in Ohio in 1993, using an entirely digital production environment for commercial, music and news production. A combination of Contemporary Country, community information, high school sports broadcasting and tight programming likely led to the ratings.

Its local community service area is unique in that Athens, Ohio is not well-served by a commercial television station, leaving residents to depend on radio for most news.

The Cattle Drive at 5 is an all request hour at 5pm. Listeners can call in 740-753-4094 ext. 1 for requests or dedications. The station also features a Theme based countdown hour called the Se7en at 7pm.

References

External links
WSEO Wild Country 107.7 Facebook
 Official Website
 

SEO
Radio stations established in 1991
1991 establishments in Ohio
Country radio stations in the United States